

List of winners
The following is a list of winners of the Golden Arena for Best Film Music at the Pula Film Festival.

Yugoslav competition (1955–1990)

Croatian competition (1992–present)

References

External links
 at the Pula Film Festival official website 

Pula Film Festival
Film music awards